Daniel Peter Crane (born 27 May 1984) is an English footballer who plays as a goalkeeper for  side Bedworth United.

Club career

Rushden & Diamonds
Crane signed for League Two side Rushden & Diamonds on 7 January 2006, and made his debut in a 2–0 away defeat to Peterborough United. Crane made eight appearances for Rushden & Diamonds during the 2005–06 season, in which the club finished bottom of League Two and were relegated to the Conference, despite this Crane signed a new one-year contract with the club.

Bromsgrove Sporting
Crane signed for Southern League Division One Central side Bromsgrove Sporting on 9 October 2018.

Gresley
Crane was confirmed as player-assistant manager of Midland League Premier Division side Gresley on 21 May 2019, working alongside manager Gavin Hurren. Dan made two league appearances for Gresley, a 4–2 away defeat to Walsall Wood on 3 August 2019, and a 2–0 away defeat to Romulus on 5 August 2019. Crane departed the club in August 2019.

Bedworth United
On 27 August 2019, Crane was confirmed as re-signing for Southern League Division One Central side Bedworth United.

References

External links
 
 

1984 births
Living people
English footballers
Footballers from Birmingham, West Midlands
Association football goalkeepers
West Bromwich Albion F.C. players
Burton Albion F.C. players
Rushden & Diamonds F.C. players
Lewes F.C. players
Cambridge United F.C. players
Corby Town F.C. players
Solihull Moors F.C. players
Hednesford Town F.C. players
Brackley Town F.C. players
Bedworth United F.C. players
Bromsgrove Sporting F.C. players
Alvechurch F.C. players
Gresley F.C. players
English Football League players
National League (English football) players
Southern Football League players